Badenella is a genus of beetles in the family Cerambycidae, containing the following species:

 Badenella badeni (Bates, 1875)
 Badenella fallaciosa Lane, 1964
 Badenella gavisa (Lane, 1966)
 Badenella ignota Lane, 1964

References

Anisocerini